Baseball was contested at the 1970 Central American and Caribbean Games in Panama City, Panama.

References
 

1970 Central American and Caribbean Games
1970
1970
Central American and Caribbean Games